A wheel washing system is a device for cleaning the tires of trucks when they are leaving a site, to control and eliminate the pollution of public roads. The installation can be made in or above the ground for either temporary or permanent applications. There are two types of wheel washing systems: roller and drive-through systems.

References

Industrial equipment
Pollution control technologies
Automotive tools
Tires